Monroe County Airport  is a county-owned public-use airport located three nautical miles (6 km) south of the central business district of Monroeville, in Monroe County, Alabama, United States. According to the FAA's National Plan of Integrated Airport Systems for 2009–2013, it is categorized as a general aviation facility.

Facilities and aircraft 
It has one runway designated 3/21 with an asphalt surface measuring 6,028 by 100 feet (1,837 x 30 m).

For the 12-month period ending July 14, 2009, the airport had 20,100 aircraft operations, an average of 55 per day: 95% general aviation and 5% military. At that time there were 16 aircraft based at this airport: 75% single-engine, 13% multi-engine, 6% jet and 6% helicopter.

References

External links 
 Aerial image as of 4 March 1997 from USGS The National Map
 Airfield photos for MVC from Civil Air Patrol
 

Airports in Alabama
County airports in the United States
Transportation in Monroe County, Alabama
Buildings and structures in Monroe County, Alabama